Georgy Valentinovich Boos (born 22 January 1963) is a Russian businessman and politician who served as the governor of Kaliningrad Oblast from 2005 to 2010.

Early life and education
Boos was born in Moscow into a Crimean German family on 22 January 1963. His parents were both engineers.He graduated from the Moscow Power Engineering Institute in 1986 with an engineering degree.

In 1995 he received a Technical Sciences Ph.D. His thesis was titled "Improving the efficiency of outdoor lighting installations of cities streets and squares".

Career
Boos performed his military service in the Soviet Air Force between 1986 and 1988 based at Spassk-Dalny.

In 1988, he was hired by the All-Union Technological and Lighting Scientific Research Institute (VNISI) in Moscow, where he remained for three years, holding the positions of Engineer, Senior Engineer and Junior Researcher. During the same time period, he was also a mathematics teacher at School № 247 in Moscow.

From 1991 to 1995, he served as director of the Moscow Scientific Production Lighting Enterprise Svetoservis, which was founded by him and his father. In 1993 the company became a joint stock company, and Boos became its CEO. Since 1994, the firm is engaged in art-architectural lighting municipal facilities of Moscow as the main contractor. For his work on many enterprise professional exhibitions was medalist and winner of awards. Svetoservis patented a number of lighting solutions, the development of which also involved GV Boos. Among them was the industrially designed lamp, designed for use in doorways, which became known as "vandal-proof".

From 1995 to 1998 and again from 1999 to 2005, he was a deputy of the State Duma, in which he served as vice-speaker (from 2003 to 2005). Boos became a close ally of Mayor Yuri Luzhkov of Moscow. He was a member of Luzhkov's centrist Fatherland Party. After it merged with the Unity Party, Boos became a member of United Russia.

From 29 September until 23 December 1998, by resolution of Russian Federation Government, was appointed as the Chairman of the State Tax Service of the Russian Federation (from 23 December until 25 May 1999, by the Decree of the President of the Russian Federation become a Minister of the Russian Federation for Taxes and Levies). In May 1999, he was dismissed with the Primakov cabinet.

On 14 September 2005 he was proposed by President Vladimir Putin to the Kaliningrad Oblast legislature as a governor of Kaliningrad Oblast and was approved soon after this. His tenure as governor ended in September 2010.

28 December 2011 G. Boos was appointed Chairman of the Board of Directors of VVC (All-Russian Exhibition Centre), but in June 2012 dismissed from the post.

14 January 2012 elected to the Board of Directors of the Holding of Interregional Distribution Grid Companies (JSC "Russian network"), and then was its chairman until 28 June 2013.

Is the owner of the holding "Boos Lighting groups".
BL Group Boos Lighting Group is a holding company that combines: a group of companies "Svetoservis", «GALAD» and «OPORA engenering».

The company "Svetoservis" was founded in 1991.
The main activity of the company: to create and develop a comfortable, functional and esthetic light environment, using progressive and ecological technologies and products of artificial light.
In 1991, the company "Svetoservis" has entered the Moscow electrotechnical market to offer complex of services for the design, installation and operation of lighting systems of all kinds of lighting.

In 1994 the Moscow government decided to create a light-color in a single environment, using a model of quality architectural lighting for the entire city. "Svetoservis" under the leadership of Boos GV, able to offer its innovative manufacturing business solutions for the implementation of a single set of architectural and art illumination of any buildings in the capital. On the eve of 1994 was successfully commissioned the first object – the hotel "Ukraine".
Since 1994, the architectural and art illumination is a visiting card of the company. "Scientific and production lighting company "Svetoservis"" becomes multiple prize winner in many professional exhibitions, won numerous awards, including awards "Victoria" in the exhibitions of Russian design "Lighting Design", International and European Prize "For the quality of services" and others.
The company implemented more than 6,000 projects, architectural, outdoor, landscape, sports and indoor lighting in more than 30 cities of Russia and abroad. Created: airports, railway transport hubs, culverts, residential infrastructure, sports and cultural complexes.
Among them: the Triumphal Arch, Large-scale interactive media facades in New Arbat, Moscow Planetarium, Lomonosov Moscow State University, Mariinsky Theatre in St. Petersburg.
"Svetoservis" develops conceptual solutions, as in the scale of cities and individual architectural objects. Architectural lighting concept designed for the cities of Lipetsk, Perm, Surgut, Sochi. Designed and commissioned lighting concept of the Moscow Kremlin, highway Novy Arbat – Kutuzov Avenue.
Thanks to "Svetoservis" 38 luxury bridges across the Moscow River shine with the colors of gems.
"Svetoservis" has developed and implemented a project of lighting legendary Olympic Park Sochi 2014.

Boos' income in 2008 amounted to 122,370,965 rubles, of which 841,572 rubles earned on the main job, were transferred to the accounts of orphanages Kaliningrad region. In 2009, revenue was 86.4 million rubles.

Personal life
Boos married three times. First to Valentina Boos, secondly to Elena Vladimirovna Lerina-Boos and third to Anna Boos. He has eight children.

Honours and award
 Order For Merit to the Fatherland 4th class (21 January 2008) – for outstanding contribution to the socio-economic development of the region and many years of fruitful work
 Order of Honour (28 January 2004) – for active participation in legislative activities and many years of diligent work
 Medal "For Services in the Conduct of the Population Census"
 Medal "In Commemoration of the 850th Anniversary of Moscow"
 Medal "In Commemoration of the 300th Anniversary of Saint Petersburg"
 Jubilee Medal "70 Years of the Armed Forces of the USSR"
 State Prize of the Russian Federation in the field of literature and art in 1996 (29 May 1997) – for the formation of light-color Moscow environment
 Diploma of the Government of the Russian Federation (6 July 1999) – for services to the state and years of diligent work
 Medal "Federation Council. 15 years "(2008) – for many years of hard work, great contribution to the interaction of the Federation Council of the Federal Assembly of the Russian Federation and state bodies, organizations in the development and improvement of the federal legislation of the Russian Federation, and the strengthening of the Russian state in connection with the 15th anniversary Council of Federation of the Federal Assembly of the Russian Federation
 Commander of the Order "For Merit" (Gabon, 2000)
 Order of Holy Blessed Prince Daniel of Moscow II degree (ROC, 2006)
 Higher Law Award "Themis" (17 February 2007) in the category "Russia and Europe" – For the development of civil society in the process of integration of the Russian Federation and the European Union
 Honorary Doctor of BFU. Kant (2012)

References

External links
Biography in Russian from Peoples.ru

1963 births
Living people
Engineers from Moscow
Businesspeople from Moscow
Heads of the federal subjects of Russia of German descent
Governors of Kaliningrad Oblast
United Russia politicians
Our Home – Russia politicians
20th-century Russian politicians
Recipients of the Order of Honour (Russia)
Communist Party of the Soviet Union members
21st-century Russian politicians
Moscow Power Engineering Institute alumni
Recipients of the Order "For Merit to the Fatherland", 4th class
Second convocation members of the State Duma (Russian Federation)
Third convocation members of the State Duma (Russian Federation)
Fourth convocation members of the State Duma (Russian Federation)
Politicians from Moscow